Youssef Fares (born 1906, date of death unknown) was an Egyptian sports shooter. He competed in the trap event at the 1952 Summer Olympics.

References

1906 births
Year of death missing
Egyptian male sport shooters
Olympic shooters of Egypt
Shooters at the 1952 Summer Olympics
Place of birth missing